Shahin Saghebi is an Iranian footballer who plays for Tractor in the Persian Gulf Pro League.

Club career

Malavan
Saghebi played his entire career in Malavan. He scored his first goal for Malavan against Mes Rafsanjan on 29 October 2013 in the Hazfi Cup. His first league goal was against Malavan's arch-rivals Damash in El Gilano, ensuring Malavan's historic 3–0 win in Rasht. He scored the third goal of Malavan's 4–2 win over Esteghlal on 19 February 2014.

Tractor
Saghebi joined Tractor in summer 2014 with a two-year contract while he was contracted with Malavan. However Tractor later announced that he and Mohammad Pour Rahmatollah joined Tractor to spend their conscription period.

Statistics

International career

U23
He invited to Iran U-23 training camp by Nelo Vingada to preparation for Incheon 2014 and 2016 AFC U-22 Championship (Summer Olympic qualification).

Senior
Saghebi was called up by Carlos Queiroz to Iranian national team on 7 November 2014 for upcoming friendly match with South Korea.

References

External links
 Shahin Saghebi on Instagram
 Shahin Saghebi at PersianLeague.com
 Shahin Saghebi at IranLeague.com
 Shahin Saghebi at FFIRI.ir

1993 births
Living people
Malavan players
Tractor S.C. players
Iranian footballers
People from Ardabil
Association football forwards